This is a list of prefectures, including prefecture-level cities and prefectures, of Anhui, China by gross domestic product (GDP).

2017 List

Historical Data

2016 List

2015 List

References

Economy of Anhui